
Univ Holy Dormition Lavra of the Studite Rite is the only lavra of the Ukrainian Greek Catholic Church. It is situated in Univ, Lviv Raion, Lviv Oblast. The monastery houses about 100 Studite Brethren.

History 
The original Orthodox monastery was founded ca. 1400 by Theodore, the son of Liubartas. Parts of the 15th century walls survive. The abbey was surrounded by a high rampart and a deep moat. The main church is dedicated to the Assumption of Mary. It was built after a Tatar raid in 1548 and looks like a small fortress. A two-storey bell tower from the 1630s stands nearby.

In the 18th century Univ housed a printing house. The monastery was disbanded in 1790. Mykhajlo Levitsky transformed the property into his residence. The moat was filled in and parts of the medieval wall were demolished. Levitsky's summer palace dates from the 1820s. The lavra was re-established in 1904 on the basis of the Krystinopil (now Chervonohrad ) Basil Monastery by the Metropolitan Andrey Sheptytsky.

See also
Persecution of Christians in the Soviet Union
USSR anti-religious campaign (1917–1921)
USSR anti-religious campaign (1921–1928)
USSR anti-religious campaign (1928–1941)
USSR anti-religious campaign (1958–1964)
USSR anti-religious campaign (1970s–1990)

References

External links 
 

Eastern Catholic monasteries in Ukraine
Ukrainian Catholic monasteries
Studite Brethren monasteries
Monasteries in Lviv Oblast
Lavras